Alejandro Awada (December 7, 1961) is an Argentine character actor of Syrian and Lebanese descent. He has appeared in a great number of television series, programmes and onstage.

Personal life
Awada was born on 3 December 1961 in Villa Ballester, Argentina, the son of the businessman Ibrahim Awada, a Lebanese Muslim immigrant native of Baalbek, and Elsa Esther "Pomi" Baker, of Syrian descent.

He was known for his relations with Melanie Alfie, Marina Borensztein and Sabrina Farji and presently with Mishal Katz. He has one daughter, Naiara.

His sister Juliana was the First Lady of Argentina as she is married to Mauricio Macri, elected President of Argentina.

Filmography 
Yosi, the Regretful Spy (2022) TV Series
Sangre Blanca (2018)
El Otro Hombre (2018)
The Bar (2017)
Nafta Super (2016) (mini) TV Series
Historia de un clan (2015) (mini) TV Series
Francis: Pray for Me (2015)
The Games Maker (2014)
Gone Fishing (2012)
Bye Bye Life (2006)
El Ratón Pérez (2006) (voice)
Suspiros del corazón (2006)
El Aura (2005)
Tigre escondido, El (2005)
Suerte está echada, La (2005)
"Hombres de honor" (2005) TV Series
Partiendo átomos (2005)
Traductor, El (2005)
"Sin crédito" (2005) (mini) TV Series
Peligrosa obsesión (2004)
Whisky Romeo Zulu (2004)
Ay Juancito (2004)
48, El (2004)
Borde del tiempo, El (2004) 
Arizona sur (2004)
Los simuladores (2002) TV Series
"Sol negro" (2003) (mini) TV Series
Séptimo arcángel, El (2003)
Día que me amen, El (2003)
Dibu 3 (2002)
Cabeza de tigre (2001)
La Fuga (2001)
Un amor de Borges (2000)
Nueve reinas (2000)
Camino, El (2000)
Tesoro mío (2000)
Sueño de los héroes, El (1997)
Comodines (1997)
Nano (telenovela, 1994) TV Series

Awards
 2015 Martín Fierro Awards
 Best actor of miniseries

Nominations
 2013 Martín Fierro Awards - Best actor of miniseries

References

External links
 

1961 births
Living people
Argentine people of Lebanese descent
Argentine people of Syrian descent
Argentine male film actors
People from San Martín, Buenos Aires
Argentine male television actors
20th-century Argentine male actors
21st-century Argentine male actors